The Ames Brothers were a singing quartet, consisting of four siblings from Malden, Massachusetts, who were particularly famous in the 1950s for their traditional pop music hits.

Biography
The Urick brothers were born in Malden, Massachusetts. Joe (born Joseph Urick; May 3, 1921 – December 22, 2007), Gene (February 13, 1924 – April 26, 1997), Vic (May 20, 1925 – January 23, 1978), and Ed Ames (born Edmund Dantes Urick on July 9, 1927) formed the singing group the Amory Brothers, which would become the Ames Brothers.

Born into a non-professional but musically talented family, the boys were raised to enjoy classical music and operatic music. Their parents, David and Sarah Urick, were Russian Jewish immigrants from Ukraine who read Shakespeare and semi-classics to their nine children from the time they were old enough to listen.

Three of the brothers formed a quartet with a cousin named Lennie, and had been touring United States Army and Navy bases entertaining the troops when they were offered a job at The Fox and Hounds nightclub, one of the fanciest clubs in Boston. This one-week engagement turned into several months when positive word-of-mouth about their appearance got around. At the time, they were using Vic's middle name and calling themselves the Amory Brothers.  They were becoming quite popular in the area and it was at this time that Joe decided to rejoin the group. Taking their act to New York City, they got a job with bandleader Art Mooney. One day while at Leeds Publishing Company in search of a song called "Should I" that their mother had asked them to sing, Milt Gabler of Decca Records overheard them singing it and asked them to cut a few sides for Decca Records, just before the AFM recording ban which James Petrillo imposed in January 1948.

The ban was lifted a year later. The brothers shortened Amory to Ames and became the first artists to record for the newly founded Coral Records, a subsidiary of Decca. They were swept into national top billing with their first hit record, "Rag Mop", in January 1950. Doing radio shows for free at times, just for the experience, they later became regulars on such shows as Arthur Godfrey and His Friends. One of the first acts to appear on the original The Ed Sullivan Show when it was known as Toast of the Town, they made their debut with him when the show was telecast live from Wanamaker's Department Store.

Soon, they were the top paid group in nightclubs and supper clubs everywhere and their popularity on television was nationwide. In 1956, they starred in their own show, The Ames Brothers Show, which was seen on Friday nights. It was the first syndicated television show to be shown in foreign countries. The brothers also appeared on ABC's The Pat Boone Chevy Showroom.

Over their fifteen-year career, their prolific work notched up 49 US chart entries, 21 of them on the Coral label before signing with RCA Victor. The group disbanded in 1963, but Ed Ames continued with a successful singing and acting career, including playing Daniel Boone's sidekick, Mingo, on the popular Daniel Boone television series.

Legacy
They were inducted into the Vocal Group Hall of Fame in 1998.

After disbanding
Vic died in a car accident in 1978 at age 52, Gene died of cancer in 1997 at age 73, and Joe died of a heart attack in 2007 at age 86. , Ed (age ) is the last surviving member.

Discography

Singles
NOTE: Repeat titles of Coral tracks shown below are standard singles and not under Coral's "Silver Star Series" reissue line

Albums
Sing a Song of Christmas (1950)
Sweet Leilani (1951)
Sentimental Me (1951)
Home on the Range (1952)
Favorite Spirituals (1952)
Hoop-De-Doo (1952)
In the Evening by the Moonlight (1953)
Love's Old Sweet Songs (1955)
The Magic Melting Pot of Melody with Hugo Winterhalter and His Orchestra (1956)
Exactly Like You with Joe Reisman and His Orchestra (1956)
The Ames Brothers with Hugo Winterhalter and His Orchestra (1956)
My Love Serenade (1957)
The Sounds of Christmas Harmony (1957)
There'll Always Be a Christmas with Sid Ramin's Orchestra (1957)
Destination Moon with Sid Ramin's Orchestra (1958)
Smoochin' Time with Sid Ramin's Orchestra (1958)
The Best of the Ames (1958)
The Ames Brothers Sing the Best in the Country (1959)
The Ames Brothers Sing Famous Hits of Famous Quartets with Hugo Winterhalter and His Orchestra (1959)
Hello Amigos with Esquivel's Orchestra (1960)
The Blend and the Beat (1960)
Hello Italy! (arranged by Bill McElhiney) (1963)
Knees Up! Mother Brown (1963)
For Sentimental Reasons (1964)
Down Memory Lane with the Ames Brothers (1964)
The Best of the Ames (1975; reissue of the 1958 LP)
The Very Best Of The Ames Brothers (1998)

References

Further reading
 Clarke, Donald. The Penguin Encyclopedia of Popular Music, Viking 1989.
 Larkin, Colin. The Encyclopedia of Popular Music, Third edition, Macmillan, 1998.
 Kinkle, Roger D. The Complete Encyclopedia of Popular Music and Jazz, 1900–1950, Arlington, 1974.
 Whitburn, Joel. Joel Whitburn's Pop memories 1890–1954. The history of American popular music compiled form America's popular music charts 1890–1954, Record Research Inc., 1986.

External links
Vocal Group Hall of Fame page on The Ames Brothers
Obituary in the Los Angeles Daily News
Ames Brothers' Facebook page Videos, Conversations, Photos, The history of the Ames Brothers
 The Ames Brothers recordings at the Discography of American Historical Recordings.
 
 

Family musical groups
Musical groups from Massachusetts
Jewish American musicians
People from Malden, Massachusetts
Vocal quartets
Decca Records artists
RCA Victor artists
Epic Records artists
American pop music groups
Traditional pop music singers
Sibling quartets
Coral Records artists
Signature Records artists